City on a Hill: The Gathering is the fourth album released in the City on a Hill series of compilation albums by popular contemporary Christian musicians.

Track listing
"Shall We Gather at River" - Prelude
"The Gathering" - Caedmon's Call, Dan Haseltine, Charlie Lowell, Bebo Norman, Sara Groves
"Kyrie Eleison" - Leigh Nash & friends
"Beautiful Scandalous Night" - Sixpence None the Richer and Bebo Norman
"Jesus Went to the Garden" - Derri Daugherty, Paul Colman, Dan Haseltine, Sara Groves, GlassByrd
"Table of the Lord" - FFH and Paul Colman
"Holy is the Lord" - Andrew Peterson
"We Will Trust You" - Ginny Owens and GlassByrd
"Come Thou Fount of Every Blessing" - Jars of Clay
"Come Be Who You Are" - Sara Groves
"Instrument of Peace" - Paul Colman Trio
"Hallelujah Never Ending" - Caedmon's Call and Silers Bald
"Open Your Eyes" - Ginny Owens
"Marvelous Light" - Dan Haseltine, Ginny Owens, and friends

Gathering, The
2003 compilation albums